
Anamim (‘Ănāmīm) is, according to the Bible, either a son of Ham's son Mizraim or the name of a people descending from him. Biblical scholar Donald E. Gowan describes their identity as "completely unknown."

The name should perhaps be attached to a people in North Africa, probably in the surrounding area of Egypt. A text from Assyria, dating from the time of Sargon II, apparently calls the Egyptians "Anami". Medieval biblical exegete, Saadia Gaon, identified the Anamim with the indigenous people of Alexandria, in Egypt.

See also
 Generations of Noah

References

Citations

Bibliography

Book of Genesis people
Hebrew Bible nations
Ham (son of Noah)
Noach (parashah)
Mizraim